Wilson Rock is a rock, 183 m high, lying 1.4 nautical miles (2.6 km) west of Bristol Island in the South Sandwich Islands. Discovered by Captain James Cook in 1775, but more accurately charted by Admiral Thaddeus Bellingshausen in 1819–20. Recharted in 1930 by DI personnel on the Discovery II and named for Sir Samuel H. Wilson, Permanent Under-Secretary of State for the British Colonies.

Wilson Rock is the middle rock of a chain of rocks extending WSW from Turmoil Point, the westernmost point of Bristol Island. These are Grindle Rock, Wilson Rock and Freezland Rock.

Rock formations of South Georgia and the South Sandwich Islands